The grayish mouse opossum (Tlacuatzin canescens) is a species of opossum endemic to Mexico. It is the sole species in the genus Tlacuatzin.

Description
The body is covered in short, soft fur, with a slightly woolly texture. As the common name suggests, the fur is pale to brownish grey in colour, fading to white or near-white on the under parts and legs. In addition, clearly visible rings of black hair occur around the eyes, and, on females, patches of orange fur in the groin region, sometimes extending to the thighs and up the midline almost to the throat.

The whiskers are relatively short, and the ears are rounded, hairless, and dark in colour. The tail is long and prehensile, and hairless for almost all of its length, apart from the base. Females have nine teats, but, unlike many other marsupials, do not have a pouch.

Distribution and habitat
It is endemic to Mexico from southern Sonora to Oaxaca, with populations also on the Islas Marías and in the central Yucatán Peninsula. It occupies seasonally arid habitats, especially mixed deciduous forests, but also scrub, grassland, and agricultural land. Two subspecies are currently recognised:

 Tlacuatzin canescens canescens - Majority of range
 Tlacuatzin canescens gaumeri - Yucatán Peninsula

The main risks that threaten the Grayish mouse opossum is deforestation and competition with introduced species such as the Rattus rattus, known more commonly as the Black rat.

Biology and behaviour
The grayish mouse opossum is solitary and semiarboreal, being more terrestrial in its habits than other mouse opossums. The species has an omnivorous diet, but feeds mainly on insects such as bugs, cockroaches, moths, and beetles. It occasionally feeds on small lizards and bird eggs, and also feeds on fruit such as figs, coconuts, and oranges. Predators include barn owls and pumas.

A nocturnal animal, the grayish mouse opossum spends the day in nests, generally in forks or hollows of trees, bushes or cacti, or in rock crevices. The nests are globular, constructed of leaves and stems, and lined with grass or plant fibres, such as the "cotton" obtained from kapok trees. It may also use the abandoned hanging nests of orioles or wrens.

Breeding occurs in late summer and early autumn. The animals mate while hanging upside down from their tails, with the male tightly holding onto the female's neck with its jaws. The litter size ranges from 8 to 14. The young attach themselves to teats shortly after birth, and are sheltered by a pouch-like layer of hair, in the absence of a true pouch.

Parasites
Not many parasites have been recorded from the grayish mouse opossum. The pinworm Tlacuatzoxyuris simpsoni (Nematoda, Oxyuridae), a parasite of the cecum, has been described in 2019.

References

Opossums
Endemic mammals of Mexico
Marsupials of North America
Fauna of Islas Marías
Fauna of the Yucatán Peninsula
Mammals described in 1893
Taxonomy articles created by Polbot
Sinaloan dry forests
Jalisco dry forests
Fauna of the Southern Pacific dry forests